The 1962–63 Ranji Trophy was the 29th season of the Ranji Trophy. Bombay won the title defeating Rajasthan in the final. The tournament was severely impacted by the Chinese Aggression of 1962. Services and Railways pulled out of the tournament after playing one game each. Being so close to the action Assam and Odisha had to pull out of the tournament. When the ceasefire was ordered, the invaders were only a few kilometres away from Tezpur, which was the headquarters of Assam cricket. Bihar played one match and then closed their season as most of their players were employed in firms and factories which were pressed into defence production.

Highlights
8-ball overs were used for the only time in Ranji Trophy.
Following India's 0–5 loss to West Indies in the 1961–62 away series, BCCI contracted four West Indian fast bowlers to play in the Ranji Trophy. Thus Charlie Stayers played for Bombay, Roy Gilchrist for Hyderabad, Lester King for Bengal and Chester Watson for Delhi.
Subhash Gupte took 15 for 104 for Rajasthan v Vidarbha. This was the best bowling in a match in Ranji Trophy till 1985–86.
Rajinder Goel took 6 for 6 in four overs for Northern Punjab v Southern Punjab.
Pankaj Roy scored hundreds in both innings for Bengal v Hyderabad in the quarter final. This match involved fiery bowling by the West Indian fast bowlers Roy Gilchrist and Lester King
G. S. Ramchand scored a hundred in his third successive Ranji final, a unique feat.

Group stage

West Zone

East Zone

North Zone

South Zone

Central Zone

Knockout stage

Final

Notes

Scorecards and averages
Cricketarchive

References

External links

1963 in Indian cricket
Ranji Trophy seasons
Domestic cricket competitions in 1962–63